The 2003 Uncle Tobys Hardcourts was a women's tennis tournament played on outdoor hard courts. It was the 7th edition of the event then known as the Uncle Tobys Hardcourts, and was a Tier III event on the 2003 WTA Tour. It took place in Gold Coast, Queensland, Australia, from 29 December 2002 through 4 January 2003. Second-seeded Nathalie Dechy won the singles title.

Finals

Singles

 Nathalie Dechy defeated  Marie-Gayanay Mikaelian, 6–3, 3–6, 6–3
 It was Dechy's only singles title of her career.

Doubles

 Svetlana Kuznetsova /  Martina Navratilova defeated  Nathalie Dechy /  Émilie Loit, 6–4, 6–4

External links
 ITF tournament edition details
 Tournament draws

 
Uncle Tobys Hardcourts
Brisbane International
Uncle Tobys Hardcourts
Uncle Tobys Hardcourts
Uncle Tobys Hardcourts